Podolaelaps is a genus of mites in the family Laelapidae.

Species
 Podolaelaps ambulacrus Berlese, 1888

References

Laelapidae